The 1903 Clemson Tigers baseball team represented Clemson University in the 1903 college baseball season.

Roster

Schedule

References

External links
Heisman's contract 

Clemson Tigers baseball seasons
Clemson
Clemson baseball